Tangqiao is a station on Shanghai Metro Line 4. Service began at this station on 29 December 2007. It is the first station in Pudong when travelling counter-clockwise after crossing the Huangpu River from Puxi. The West exit opens up to the Shanghai Sheraton, while the East exit opens up to a shopping mall.

Places nearby
Renji Hospital (East Part)
Shanghai Children's Medical Center

References

Shanghai Metro stations in Pudong
Line 4, Shanghai Metro
Railway stations in China opened in 2007
Railway stations in Shanghai